This is a list of universities in Fiji.
University of the South Pacific (Suva)
University of Fiji (Lautoka)
Fiji National University (Suva)

 
Fiji
Fiji
Universities